Polly Dean Holliday (born July 2, 1937) is an American actress who has appeared on stage, television and in film. She is best known for her portrayal of sassy waitress Florence Jean "Flo" Castleberry on the 1970s sitcom Alice, which she reprised in its short-lived spin-off, Flo. Her character's catchphrase of "Kiss my grits!" remains the most memorable line associated with the series Alice.

Early life
Holliday was born in Jasper, Alabama, the daughter of  Ernest Sullivan Holliday, a truck driver, and Velma Mabell Holliday (née Cain). She grew up in Childersburg and Sylacauga, where her brother Doyle's boyhood friend, Jim Nabors, lived. 

Holliday attended the Alabama College for Women at Montevallo (now known as The University of Montevallo) in the late 1950s where she excelled in the theater department, playing the lead roles in "The Lady's Not for Burning" and "Medea". She graduated in 1959 with a degree in piano. She went on to Florida State University, and spent the first phase of her career earning respect on the classical stage.

Holliday worked as a piano teacher in her native Alabama, and then in Florida. She began her professional acting career as a member of the Asolo Theatre Company in Sarasota, Florida, where she stayed for 10 years. 

Holliday is an Episcopalian who sang in the St. Andrews Episcopal Choir in Mobile, Alabama and in January 2010 she appeared as herself in an official advertisement campaign for the Episcopal Church. In New York City, she sang in the Grace Church (Episcopal) Choral Society in Greenwich Village and ran a chamber music series there called the Willow Ensemble (1995-2008).

Career
In 1973, Holliday moved to New York City and appeared in Alice Childress's play Wedding Band at the Public Theater. More than a year later, she was cast in the Broadway hit All Over Town. While working on All Over Town, she befriended the play's director, Dustin Hoffman, who later worked with her on the 1976 movie All the President's Men.

In 1976 Holliday was cast — in what would be her major break — as sassy, man-hungry waitress Flo Castleberry on the American sitcom Alice. Her character coined the popular catchphrase "Kiss my grits!" The phrase became part of the American vocabulary. Holliday starred in Alice from 1976 to 1980, and then moved to her own short-lived spin-off show, titled Flo, in which Flo left her residence in Arizona and moved back home. The show was successful during its abbreviated first season, but ratings declined during the following season due to a time change, and it was canceled in 1981.

In 1983, Holliday joined the cast of the CBS-TV sitcom Private Benjamin as a temporary replacement for series regular Eileen Brennan, who was recovering from serious injuries after being struck by a car.

Holliday also made appearances on television shows such as The Golden Girls, where she played Rose Nylund's blind sister Lily, in a recurring role as Jill Taylor's mother on Home Improvement, and a regular character on The Client.

Holliday's notable roles in films include All the President's Men, Moon Over Parador, Mrs. Doubtfire, the 1998 remake of The Parent Trap and her role as Mrs. Ruby Deagle in the 1984 hit Gremlins, for which she won the Saturn Award for Best Supporting Actress.

On the Broadway stage, she has appeared in revivals of Arsenic and Old Lace (1986) as Martha Brewster, one of the dotty, homicidal, sweet old aunties; Cat on a Hot Tin Roof (1990), for which she was nominated for a Tony for her portrayal of Big Mama; and Picnic (1994). She also appeared in the 1998 remake of The Parent Trap as the director of Camp Walden. In 2000, she appeared at Lincoln Center in a revival of Arthur Laurents's The Time of the Cuckoo.

In 2000, she was inducted into the Alabama Stage and Screen Hall of Fame.

Filmography

Film

Television movies

Television series

References

External links
 
 
 
 Polly Holliday biography as part of the cast of Alice
 Polly Holliday (Aveleyman)

1937 births
Living people
Actresses from Alabama
People from Jasper, Alabama
American film actresses
American stage actresses
American television actresses
Best Supporting Actress Golden Globe (television) winners
Florida State University alumni
20th-century American actresses
21st-century American actresses
American Episcopalians
Alabama Democrats
California Democrats
Florida Democrats
New York (state) Democrats